The Commander of the Armed Forces is the professional head of the Armed Forces of Paraguay.

Commanders

References

Paraguay
Military of Paraguay